Hermansky–Pudlak syndrome 3 protein is a protein that in humans is encoded by the HPS3 gene.

This gene encodes a protein containing a potential clathrin-binding motif, consensus dileucine signals, and tyrosine-based sorting signals for targeting to vesicles of lysosomal lineage. The encoded protein may play a role in organelle biogenesis associated with melanosomes, platelet dense granules, and lysosomes. Mutations in this gene are associated with Hermansky–Pudlak syndrome type 3. Alternate splice variants exist, but their full length sequence has not been determined.

References

External links
  GeneReviews/NCBI/NIH/UW entry on Hermansky–Pudlak syndrome

Further reading